The Pilot: A Tale of the Sea is a historical novel by James Fenimore Cooper, first published in January 1824 (though the earliest edition is actually dated 1823). Its subject is the life of a naval pilot during the American Revolution. It is often considered the earliest example of nautical fiction in American literature.

Background
The Pilot was Cooper's fourth novel and his first sea tale. A sailor by profession, Cooper had undertaken to surpass Walter Scott's Pirate (1821) in seamanship.

Plot
The hero of the book is John Paul Jones, who appears as always brooding upon a dark past and a darker fate. Yet he is not so morbid but that he can occasionally rouse himself to terrific activities in his raids along the English coast. Another character is Long Tom Coffin, of Nantucket, comparable to Harvey Birch and Natty Bumppo from Cooper's other novels.

Characters
 John Paul Jones — America's First Naval Hero
 Captain Munson — Commander of frigate. Ariel ship
 Edward Griffith — Lieutenant, who is in love with Katherine Plowden
 Richard Barnstable — Lieutenant, who is in love with Ceclia Howard.
 Long Tom Coffin — Coxswain, Who directs the boat, He is six feet tall.
 Katherine Plowden — Richard Barnstable's lover.
 Ceclia Howard — Cousin of Katherine and lover of Edward Griffith.
 Captain Manual — American Marine
 Colonel Howard — Father of Cecilia, Howard Owner of St. Ruth Abbey.
 Christopher Dillon — Attorney, a morose, self-centered and malign man
 Captain Borroughchiffe  — A Recruiting Officer, Commander of a company of Green Troop, Guardian of the Abbey, A British Soldier
 Alice Dunscombe — Old companion to Katherine and Cecilia
 Peters — One of the guardian in the Navy who is killed by Edward Griffith
 Colonel Fitzgerald — Colonel
 Caeser — Black Slave from St. Ruth Abbey
 Pompey — Black Slave from St. Ruth Abbey
 Merry — Midshipman and cousin of Katherine and Cecilia, who newly took charge of Ariel, the ship of the American Navy.

Notes

References
 The "keen-eyed critic of the ocean": James Fenimore Cooper's Invention of the Sea Novel, by Luis Iglesias at the Cooper Panel of the 2006 Conference of the American Literature Association in San Francisco.

External links

1824 American novels
Novels by James Fenimore Cooper
Historical novels
Nautical novels